Fly Union (sometimes stylized as Fly.Union) is an American hip hop group from Columbus, Ohio. The group consists of production duo MnkeyWrench (Iyeball and Jay Swifa) and rapper Jerreau. Rapper Vada Azeem was also a founder and member of the collective before parting ways with the group in 2008. They are most notable for their debut studio album, TGTC (The Greater Than Club), which reached the number one spot on iTunes' New Hip Hop chart in 2011.

Career
Fly Union has worked with popular artists such as Big Sean, Casey Veggies, Chip Tha Ripper, Curren$y, Dom Kennedy, Kendrick Lamar, Naledge, Pusha T, Schoolboy Q, Talib Kweli, and Willie the Kid.

In 2012, Fly Union was one of the artists featured in BET's Music Matters Tour.

Recognition
On December 11, 2012, Fly Union was featured on XXL's We Got Next.

On July 27, 2013, it was announced that the song "Long Run" would be featured on the soundtrack to NBA 2K14.

Discography

Studio albums
 TGTC (The Greater Than Club) (2011)
 Small Victories (2014)

Extended plays
 Until Forever (2011)

Mixtapes
 Value Pack 1 (2009)
 Value Pack 2 (2009)
 Value Pack 3 (2009)
 Value Pack 4 (2010)
 Value Pack 5 (2010)
 Value Pack 6 (2010)
 Value Pack 7: Zenith (2012)

Compilations
 Super Pack (2010)
 Super Pack 2 (2013)

Production discography

2010

 Naledge – Twenty Something
 20. "Never Over (Remix)"

2011

 Currensy - Jet Files
 06. "Stay Up" (featuring Fly Union)

2012

 Casey Veggies – Customized Greatly Vol. 3
 07. "When You See The Kid"

 Dom Kennedy – Yellow Album
 02. "Been Thuggin"

 Pusha T – 
 "Pies"

References

External links
Official website

American hip hop groups
American hip hop record producers
American hip hop singers
Midwest hip hop groups
Midwest hip hop musicians
Musical groups from Columbus, Ohio
Rappers from Columbus, Ohio